James Michael Ritze (born October 16, 1948) is an American politician from the state of Oklahoma United States. A Republican, Ritze served as a member of the Oklahoma House of Representatives, representing the 80th district, which includes parts of Tulsa and Wagoner counties.

Career
Ritze was first elected to the Oklahoma House of Representatives in 2008. He sponsored a bill in 2009 to have a monument to the Ten Commandments installed at the Oklahoma State Capitol. His family supplied $10,000 to fund the monument, which was installed in 2012.

On the night of Thursday, October 23, 2014, someone drove a vehicle across the Oklahoma State Capitol lawn and into the monument, shattering it. Police impounded the vehicle and started an investigation. A second copy of the monument has been made and erected to replace it.

In July 2015, the Oklahoma Supreme Court ruled that the re-erected monument must be removed because it violates the Oklahoma Constitution. The case was Prescott v. Capitol Preservation Commission.

Ritze has a hardline stance on immigration. In an interview with a local news reporter on May 10, 2017, Ritze (referring to 82,000 non-English speaking students in Oklahoma) suggested that the state "identify them and then turn them over to ICE to see if they truly are citizens" and then asked, "and do we really have to educate non-citizens?" In answer to that question, The Washington Post pointed out that the 1982 U.S. Supreme Court decision Plyler v. Doe prohibits states from denying education based on immigration status.

In May 2018, Ritze was accused of embellishing his military record by claiming to have been injured in the line of duty.

Ritze was defeated in the primary election in August 2018

Personal life 
Ritze is married to Connie Ritze, a registered nurse, with whom he has four children. He is a Sunday school teacher and an ordained deacon at Arrow Heights Baptist Church in Broken Arrow.

References

External links
 Member's page at Oklahoma State Legislature
 Campaign website

Living people
Republican Party members of the Oklahoma House of Representatives
People from Broken Arrow, Oklahoma
1948 births
21st-century American politicians
People from Trenton, Missouri